was a town located in Ayauta District, Kagawa Prefecture, Japan.

As of 2003, the town had an estimated population of 19,239 and a density of 500.10 persons per km². The total area was 38.47 km².

On March 21, 2006, Ryōnan, along with the town of Ayakami (also from Ayauta District), was merged to create the town of Ayagawa.

External links
 Official website of Ayagawa 

Dissolved municipalities of Kagawa Prefecture
Ayagawa, Kagawa